Gilbert Lewis (April 6, 1936 – May 7, 2015) was an American actor who is best known for playing The King of Cartoons in the first season of the 1986 children's show, Pee-wee's Playhouse. Lewis played the King of Cartoons in thirteen episodes before being replaced by actor William Marshall. He also made guest appearances on The Fresh Prince of Bel-Air, General Hospital, and Alien Nation.

Filmography

References

External links

1941 births
2015 deaths
20th-century American male actors
American male television actors
Male actors from Philadelphia